Charles-Auguste Bertrand (29 March 1890 – 21 September 1977) was a Canadian lawyer, politician, and judge. A member of the Quebec Liberal Party, he was Attorney-General, Provincial Secretary, and Registrar in Adélard Godbout's government from 27 June to 26 August 1936.

Bertrand was a judge of the Superior Court of Quebec from 1940 until his retirement in 1965.

References 

1890 births
1977 deaths
Lawyers in Quebec
Quebec Liberal Party MNAs
Judges in Quebec
Université Laval alumni